TicketIQ (known as TiqIQ until August 2016) is a no-fee event ticket search engine, aggregator and mobile app which provides ticket-buying options from many different secondary market and primary market ticket sellers, including Ticketmaster, Eventbrite, SeatGeek and Telecharge.  The company works directly with teams, leagues, festivals and venues to sell tickets direct-to-fan using paid social and other programmatic media platforms.

History 

 TiqIQ launched on July 4, 2010 and was founded by CEO Jesse Lawrence.
Company Rebrands at TicketIQ on August 26, 2016
In 2020, the company launched FanIQ, an identity-management and marketing platform for sports teams, festivals and venues.
TiqIQ has its headquarters in New York City and has 25 employees.

Funding 
Business Insider reported in 2013 that New York based software company MediaMath invested in TiqIQ.

VentureBeat reported that TiqIQ raised venture capital from iNovia Capital and Contour Venture partners.

TiqIQ has been called "The Kayak of Live-Event Tickets" because it aggregates ticket deals from StubHub, TicketsNow, eBay and other companies, much like Kayak.com aggregates travel deals.

References

External links
 

Ticket sales companies
Online marketplaces of the United States
Internet properties established in 2010
Privately held companies based in New York City
2010 establishments in New York City